Catriona (Cat) Sparks (born 11 September 1965, Sydney, New South Wales) is an Australian science fiction writer, editor and publisher.

Publishing 
As manager and editor of Agog! Press with her partner, Australian horror writer Rob Hood, Sparks has produced ten anthologies of speculative fiction.

Writing 
She has won thirteen Ditmar Awards for writing, editing and artwork, her most recent in 2014, when her short story Scarp was awarded a Ditmar for Best Short Story and 'The Bride Price' one for Best Collected Work.
She was nominated for the Aurealis Peter McNamara Convenors' Award for Excellence in 2003 and won one in 2004 for services to the Australian SF publishing industry. In 2006 Sparks was convenor of the Horror judging panel of the Aurealis Awards, and in 2008 she was Guest of Honour at the Conflux 5 Science Fiction Convention in Canberra.

Sparks has concentrated on her writing in recent years. In 2004 Sparks graduated the inaugural Clarion South Writers' Workshop in Queensland and won third prize in the first quarter of the Writers of the Future competition. Her short fiction has been nominated for the Aurealis Awards in 2004, 2005, 2007 and 2008. Her short story Hollywood Roadkill won both the Aurealis Award for Best Science Fiction Short Story and the Golden Aurealis Award in the 2007 Aurealis Awards. Her short story Seventeen won the Aurealis Award for Best Science young Adult Short Story in the 2009 Aurealis Awards.

In 2010 Sparks replaced Damien Broderick as fiction editor of Cosmos magazine Cosmos Magazine ceased publication of short fiction in 2016.

In January 2012 she was one of 12 students chosen to participate in Margaret Atwood’s The Time Machine Doorway workshop as part of the Key West Literary Seminar Yet Another World: literature of the future. Her participation was funded by an Australia Council emerging writers grant.

In 2012 she became a provisional candidate for a Doctorate of Philosophy – Media, Culture and Creative Arts through Curtin University.

Her 2013 collection The Bride Price won the Ditmar Award for Best Collection.

She is an active member of Science Fiction Writers of America.

Her debut novel, Lotus Blue, was published by Talos Press in February 2017. Lotus Blue has been described as "Mad Max meets Terminator meets Ghost in the Shell".

Bibliography

Novels

Short fiction

Collections

Short stories
 Hacking Santorini (2020), Dark Harvest, Newcon Press
 Before Dominica (2019), Kaleidotrope
 You Will Remember Who You Were (2019), Dimension6, ed. Keith Stevenson, April 2019, Coeur de Lion Publishing. Shortlisted for an Aurealis Award.
 And the Ship Sails On (2018), Aurum: A Golden Anthology of Original Australian Fantasy, ed. Russell B Farr, Ticonderoga Publications
 Cassini Falling (2018), Continuum 14: Conjugation program book, reprinted in AntipodeanSF 250
 Fata Morgana (2018), Mother of Invention, eds Rivqa Rafael & Tansy Rayner Roberts, Twelfth Planet Press
 War is Very Popular These Days (2017), Luminescent Threads – Connections to Octavia Butler, Twelfth Planet Press
 Move over Sci Fi – Here Comes Climate Fiction (2017), The Daily Beast
 Beaming in From SXSW (2017), Cosmos Magazine 
 The One Book That Shook My Faith in Nature & Humanity (2017), Tor.com
 Cat Sparks talks ‘Lotus Blue’ and a new genre in Cli Fi (2017), Hypable
 The Big Idea (2017), Whatever
 13 Horrible Apocalypses That Will Make You Question Your Faith in Humankind (2017), Electric Literature 
 Climate science and climate fiction – where data intersects with art (2017), Boing Boing
 Prayers to Broken Stone (2017), Kaleidotrope, Spring issue 
 Dragon Girl (2016), The Year’s Best Fantasy and Horror, Ed. Liz Gryzb and Talie Helene, Ticonderoga Publications (reprint)
 Jericho Blush (2016), Cyclopean, Issue #2, Ed. Chase Capener, Cyclopean Press
 No Fat Chicks (2016), In Your Face, ed. Tehani Wessely, Fablecroft Press
 The Seventh Relic (2015), Focus 2014: highlights of Australian short fiction, ed. Tehani Wessely, Fablecroft Press (reprint)
 New Chronicles of Andras Thorn (2015), The Year’s Best Fantasy and Horror, Ed. Liz Grzyb and Talie Helene, Ticonderoga Publications (reprint)
 Hot Rods (2015), Loosed Upon the World, Saga Press, ed. John Joseph Adams (reprint) 
 Veterans Day (2015), Hear Me Roar, Ed. Liz Grzyb, Ticonderoga Publications
 Dragon Girl (2015), The Never Never Land, CSFG Publishing
 Hot Rods (2015), Lightspeed Magazine, ed. John Joseph Adams
 Street of the Dead (2015). You’re Not Alone, ed. Damien Broderick (reprint)
 New Chronicles of Andras Thorn (2014), Dimension 6, ed. Keith Stevenson, Coeur de Lion Publishing
 The Seventh Relic (2014), Phantazein, ed. Tehani Wessely, Fablecroft Publishing (winner of 2014 Best Short Story Ditmar)
 Dark Harvest (2014), Solaris Rising 3, ed. Ian Whates, Solaris
Chinaman’s Bluff (2013).
Scarp", In The Bride Price (2013). Ticonderoga Publications
Beyond the Farthest Stone (2013). In The Bride Price, Ticonderoga Publications
Daughters of Battendown (2013). In One Small Step, ed. Tehani Wessely, Fablecroft Publishing
The Alabaster Child (2011). In Gutshot: Weird West Tales, ed. Conrad Williams, PS Publishing - Anthology nominated for a British Fantasy Award
The Sleeping and the Dead (2011). In Ishtar, Morrigan Books - Nominated for a DITMAR Award
Dead Low''' (2011). In Midnight Echo #6, The Australian Horror Writers Association - Nominated for an Aurealis AwardBeautiful (2011). In Anywhere But Earth, Coeur de Lion PublishingAll the Love in the World (2010). In Sprawl, ed. Alisa Krasnostein, Twelfth Planet PressThe Piano Song (2010). In Scenes from the Second Storey, eds. Amanda Pillar and Pete Kempshaw, Morrigan BooksHeart of Stone (2009). In X6, ed. Keith Stevenson, Coeur de Lion PublishingThe Snow Leopard (2009), Borderlands Magazine, #11Seventeen (2009), In. Masques, ed. Gillian Polack, Canberra Speculative Fiction Guild. Awarded Best Young Adult Short Story in the 2009 Aurealis AwardsPiper (2008), Andromeda Spaceways Inflight Magazine, #36.Palisade (2008). In Clockwork Phoenix: Tales of Beauty and Strangeness, ed. Mike Allen, Norilana BooksShadows of Our Gods (2008), Borderlands Magazine, #10.Sammarynda Deep (2008). In Paper Cities: An Anthology of Urban Fantasy, ed. Ekaterina Sedia, Senses Five Press. Awarded Best Fantasy Short Story in the 2008 Aurealis Awards. Reprinted in Award Winning Australian Writing 2009, Melbourne BooksA Million Shades of Nightmare (2007), Dark Animus, #10. Recorded as a podcast for Outlandish Voices in 2009Hollywood Roadkill (2007), On Spec, #69. Awarded both Best Science Fiction Short Story and the Short Story Golden Aurealis in the 2007 Aurealis AwardsRight to Work (2007). In Workers Paradise, eds. Russell B. Farr and Nick Evans, Ticonderoga Publications.Champagne and Ice (2007), Aurealis.A Lady of Adestan (2007), Orb, # 7, June. Nominated for Best Fantasy Short Story in the 2007 Aurealis AwardsThe Bride Price (2007), New Ceres, #2, 2007Arctica (2007). In Fantastic Wonder Stories, ed. Russell B. Farr, Ticonderoga Publications. Nominated for Best Science Fiction Short Story in the 2007 Aurealis AwardsThe Golden Hour (2006), WyR[E]d, November.The Jarrah Run (2006), In c0ck, eds.  Andrew Macrae and Keith Stephenson, coeur de lion press.The Delicacy of Dragonflies (2006), Fables and Reflections, #8.Street of the Dead (2006), Cosmos, #9, June. Reprinted in Greek Newspaper Eleftherotypia, 2009Blue Stars For All Saviours' Day (2006). In The Outcast, ed. Nicole R. Murphy, Canberra Speculative Fiction Guild.The Ice Bride (2006), Shadowed Realms, #9, The Redback Edition.Message in a Bottle (2005), Borderlands, #6Macchiato Lane (2005), TiconderogaOnline", #5. Nominated for Best Horror Short Story in the 2005 Aurealis Awards
Historical Perspective (2005), Simulacrum, July.
Arcana (2005). In Mitch? 4: Slow Dancing in Quicksand.
Home by the Sea (2004), Orb, #6. Nominated for Best Science Fiction Short Story in the 2004 Aurealis Awards. Reprinted in The Year's Best Australian Science Fiction and Fantasy, 2005, eds. Bill Congreve and Michelle Marquardt, MirrorDanse Books
Last Dance at the Sargeant Majors' Ball (2004). Borderlands Magazine, #3, 2004. Reprinted in L Ron Hubbard presents Writers of the Future, vol XXI, 2005.
Meltdown my Plutonium Heart (2004). In Encounters, eds. Maxine McArthur and Donna Maree Hanson, Canberra Speculative Fiction Guild.
I am my Fathers Daughters (2003), Visions Magazine, #23.
The Birdcage (2003). In Elsewhere, ed. Michael Barry, Canberra Speculative Fiction Guild.
Our Lady of Spatial Anomalies (2003), Fables and Reflections, #5.
Song of the Crescent Moon (2003), Gynaezine.
Gracelands (2003), Dark Animus, #3.
Roswell 14  (co-written with Max Blaxall) (2003). In Consensual 2: The Second Coming.
Cross the Nullarbor to the Sea (2003), In Glimpses, Vision Writer's Group.
Pod (2003). In Ideomancer Unbound, eds. Mikal Trimm and Chris Clarke, Fictionwise.
Rats Nest (2003). In Potato Monkey, #3,
14 Shopping Days Till Xmas (2002), Vision Newszine.
Birthmark (2002), Antipodean SF, #55.
Arthur Nolan's Twilight (2002), Aurealis, #30.
Rites of Passage (2002). In Mitch?3: Hacks to the Max.
100% M-Hype (2002). In Passing Strange, ed. Bill Congreve, MirrorDanse Books, 2002
Reigning Cats and Dogs (2002), Andromeda Spaceways Inflight Magazine, #1.
Meltdown my Plutonium Heart (2002), Borderlands Convention Program.
Epiphany on the Wirewalk (2002), Fables and Reflections, #1.
Hollywood Hills (2002), Antipodean SF, #45.
Fuchsia Spins by Moonlight (2002), Redsine, #7
Invasion of the Latte Snatchers (2001). In Mitch?2: Tarts of the New Millennium.

Work published in anthologies
 AustrAlien Absurdities (2002), ed. Chuck McKenzie and Tansy Rayner Roberts, 
 Daikaiju! Giant Monster Tales (2005), ed. Rob Hood and Robin Pen, 
 Daikaiju! 2: Revenge of the Giant Monsters (2007), ed. Rob Hood and Robin Pen, 
 Daikaiju! 3: Giant Monster vs The World (2007), ed. Rob Hood and Robin Pen, 
 Canterbury 2100: pilgrimages in a new world (2007), ed. Dirk Flinthart,

Anthologies edited
 Agog! Ripping Reads (2006), ed. Cat Sparks, 
 Agog! Smashing Stories (2004), ed. Cat Sparks, 
 Agog! Terrific Tales (2003), ed. Cat Sparks, 
 Agog! Fantastic Fiction (2002), ed. Cat Sparks, 
 The Scary Food Cookbook, a compendium of gastronomic atrocity (2008), ed. Cat Sparks,

See also
 Catriona

References

External links
 
 2005 Australian Speculative Fiction Snapshot Interview by Ben Peek
 2007 Speculative Fiction Snapshot Interview by Alisa Krasnostein
 Interview at TiconderogaOnline

Guest Article on Ripping Ozzie Reads
Story behind The Bride Price by Cat Sparks — Online Essay
SQ Mag Interviews Cat Sparks
Catriona Sparks on IMDb

1965 births
Living people
21st-century Australian novelists
21st-century Australian short story writers
Australian publishers (people)
Australian science fiction writers
Australian women novelists
Australian women short story writers
Science fiction editors
Women science fiction and fantasy writers
Cosmos (Australian magazine) people